Nguroje is a town found on the Mambilla Plateau, in Sardauna Local Government Area of Taraba State in eastern Nigeria.

It is easy to see that the term "Nguroje" is an original rendering in Fulfulde (Fulani) language, derived from "Ngu-ram", meaning economic income. Thus, "Ngu-ro-je" (economic enclaves) is a plural of "Ngu-ro-re" (an economic enclave). The straight-away translation of the term "Nguroje" in English language is "Living Springs". "Guroji" is a non-Fulfulde rendering, perhaps by certain tribes that later came to settle in the town with the original Fulbe founders of the town.
History of Nguroje

Old Mbungnu (Mbungnu, Kwuo, Guroji, Nguroje)
Old Mbungnu (Kwuo or Kwu-Mbungnu) was the cradle of the Mbunip and Magu clans of Mambilla down to about 1890 before they separated from here. Some “Kobira” came at the beginning of the British administration and settled on the abandoned Mbungnu site, obviously a little before the Hausa man, Musa Bichi, arrived at the camp. The kobiras were former abductees, majority of whom had escaped  from their abductors after the Anglo-German War at Banyo of 1915. A few however came a few years before 1915. In the “Kobira” section, the Ward headship followed no specific line. The first Ward Head was one ‘Hamajulde’ who died in 1935. Then, ‘Dika Pullo’ became Ward Head in 1937 and died 1939. ‘Dika Pullo’ came from Tibati. Like most “Kobira”, neither his ancestry nor that of Hamajulde is ascertained. The next Ward Head was Barde, said by some to have been indigenous. He took over rulership  in 1940. 
The Kobira, because of their “detention” or “incarceration” outside their homelands, usually lost their culture and became “elements of no culture”. They commonly betrayed their roots, in many instances pretending to be allies of their own erstwhile tormentors. Many of these Kobiras were simply those who mixed with Fulanis in their sojourning and tended to behave like Fulanis. This is not to show that all the existing inhabitants of Kwu-Mbungnu were by 1915 all Kobira. There were indeed remnants of the pre-existing Kwu-Mbungnu people who were erroneously classed with the Kobira.

Hausa traders also pitched their tents at Kwu-Mbungnu on the ruins (“Guroji” = “ruins”) at the end German rule (c.1915) and inception of British suzerainty. The first itinerant Hausa traders then included he aforementioned Musa Bichi from Bichi of Kano, who was based in Garbabi and used to travel through Mambilla to Bamenda for trading just before the end of German rule. Under the British, he finally relocated from Garbabi to Old Mbungnu possibly in the late 1920s.  He became the first Hausa to settle here at Old Mbungnu site.  Musa Bichi of Kano thus became the first of the Hausa-settler trading colony that met the Kobira on the ruins of Kwu-Mbungnu. He was born and bred in Bichi near Kano and became the first Sarkin Hausawa (Ward Head) of the Hausa trading section of Kwu-Mbungnu, later called “Guroji”, Fulani term for ‘ruined town’ (a name used, until much later, exclusively by the newcomers at that time). Musa Bichi was the first head of only the Hausa section and was still Ward Head by 1932 (1938 I.R). By that year, there was no Fulani ward or head in the camp, the rare visiting graziers being noticed only in bush grass shacks.

When the cattle selling point was first set up here by the British in about 1927, more and more Hausa traders and Fulani cattle sellers were attracted in the 1930s, more so by the opportunity provided by the opening in 1926 of the Government-organized Trade Route through Mambilla to Bamenda.

In 2005, Kwu-Mbungnu  (with the “Guroje” misnomer) was made one of 20 districts created by the 2005 Order. Historically, it had been the territorial jurisdiction of the Mbon Mbunibi (Chief of Mbunip) and the 1938 Intelligence Report suggested its subsequent return to the Chief of Mbunip. There is no doubt, Nguroje is one of the most important towns on the Mambilla Plateau. Economically, It houses the biggest cattle market on the plateau and third largest in the state. Political wise, Nguroje produced the number sixth citizen of the country; that is the Deputy Speaker of the Federal House of Assembly (lower chamber) Alhaji Babangida Sa'idu Nguroje.
Nguroje is a home to Mambilla Hydroelectric power which if competed will contribute more than 3000 Mega watts to the national grid.

References

Bami-Yuno: History of the Mambilla Chiefdom, ms
1938 Intelligence Report

https://www.openstreetmap.org/#map=15/6.9575/11.1173

Populated places in Taraba State